Clathurella pertabulata is a species of sea snail, a marine gastropod mollusk in the family Clathurellidae.

Description

Distribution
This marine species occurs in the Red Sea.

References

External links
  Tucker, J.K. 2004 Catalog of recent and fossil turrids (Mollusca: Gastropoda). Zootaxa 682:1–1295.
 
 Dekker, H.; Orlin, Z. (2000). Check-list of Red Sea Mollusca. Spirula. 47 (supplement): 1–46
  Albano P.G., Bakker P.A.J., Janssen R. & Eschner A. (2017). An illustrated catalogue of Rudolf Sturany’s type specimens in the Naturhistorisches Museum Wien, Austria (NHMW): Red Sea gastropods. Zoosystematics and Evolution. 93(1): 45–94

pertabulata
Gastropods described in 1903